Demirciler (Laz: Çxala) is a village in Borçka District of Artvin Province, Turkey. Its population is 784 (2021). Situated in the forests, it is to the northeast of Çoruh River. The history of the village goes back to Sakas, Mingrelians, Seljukids, and Laz people. The present name of the village means blacksmiths, and it refers to the profession of many village residents.

References

Villages in Borçka District